Teresa Pearce (born 1 February 1955) is a British Labour Party politician who was the Member of Parliament (MP) for Erith and Thamesmead from 2010 to 2019, who was appointed as a Shadow Minister for Housing and Planning in September 2015. In the reshuffle of October 2016, Pearce was appointed as acting Shadow Secretary of State for Communities and Local Government, standing down after the 2017 general election to concentrate on her constituency.

Early life
Teresa Pearce was born in Southport, Lancashire, but was educated at the St Thomas More School in Eltham, London.  For ten years prior to her election, she was a senior manager with PricewaterhouseCoopers. She is a former Bexley councillor.

Parliamentary career
Pearce was elected to the House of Commons as Member of Parliament for Erith and Thamesmead in the 2010 general election with a majority of 5,703. In her maiden speech she stated her pride in the Labour Party's track record on Sure Start, the future jobs fund and the national minimum wage.

In 2015, she was re-elected with an increased majority of 9,525, gaining just under 50% of the vote.

In Parliament, Pearce served on a number of Select Committees between 2010 and 2015, sitting on both the Work and Pensions Select Committee (2010–2015) and the Treasury Select Committee (2011–2015). Pearce also shortly served on the Public Accounts Committee (2015) before she was appointed to serve as Shadow Minister for Housing and Planning in September 2015. She was appointed as the Shadow Secretary of State for Communities and Local Government in the October 2016 reshuffle, but it was announced she intends to stand down from the post after the May 2017 local elections.

She supported Owen Smith in the failed attempt to replace Jeremy Corbyn in the 2016 Labour Party (UK) leadership election.

Pearce was re-elected in the general election 2017, with an increased majority of 10,014, gaining over 57% of the vote.

In July 2019, Pearce announced that she would stand down at the next general election.

Personal life
Pearce has two adult daughters. She had her first daughter when she was 18 and said she knows from experience what it is like to be "written off" as a teenage mother. She has 5 grandchildren.

References

External links
Teresa Pearce website

1955 births
Living people
Female members of the Parliament of the United Kingdom for English constituencies
Councillors in the London Borough of Bexley
Labour Party (UK) MPs for English constituencies
UK MPs 2010–2015
UK MPs 2015–2017
UK MPs 2017–2019
21st-century British women politicians
21st-century English women
21st-century English people
Women councillors in England